Kainantu District is a district of the Eastern Highlands Province in Papua New Guinea. Its capital is Kainantu.

Districts of Eastern Highlands Province